Lake Bellevue, also called Lake Sturtevant, is a small lake inside the city limits of Bellevue, Washington. Along with Phantom Lake and Larsen Lake, it is one of three small lakes inside the city, which also borders Lake Washington and Lake Sammamish. , a tributary of Kelsey Creek, has its origin at Lake Bellevue and contains Chinook (an endangered species), Sockeye and Coho salmon. In the  creek basin, 71% of the land has an impervious surface (roads and parking lots).

The lake is named for settler , a United States Civil War veteran who homesteaded there in 1872.

Tracks for the Northern Pacific Railroad passing near the lake were laid in 1904. Sound Transit acquired part of the right of way for East Link Extension light rail. The Wilburton station, under construction in 2017, will be near the west side of the lake. The Spring District development and its separate light rail station about one half mile (one kilometer) away will be near the northeastern shore of the lake.

See also
, a lake an in the adjacent city of Kirkland, with similar surface area and geology, also homesteaded by a Civil War veteran

References

External links

Lakes of King County, Washington
Geography of Bellevue, Washington